The Long and Faraway Gone is a novel written by Lou Berney and published by William Morrow (later acquired by HarperCollins) on 10 February 2015 which later went on to win 3 literary awards.

Awards 
 Macavity Award for Best Mystery (2016)
 Anthony Award for Best Paperback Original (2016)
 Edgar Award for Best Paperback Original (2016)

References 

Edgar Award-winning works
Anthony Award-winning works
Macavity Award-winning works
American mystery novels